The 2011 Mnet Asian Music Awards took place on November 29, 2011, at Singapore Indoor Stadium in Singapore. The ceremony was the second Mnet Asian Music Awards to occur outside of South Korea, the first being in 2010 when the ceremony took place in Macau, China. The 2011 award show was attended by over 10,000 people.

Super Junior won three awards, the most of the night, including Album of the Year for Mr. Simple, Best Male Group, and the special Singapore's Choice Award. Girls' Generation, 2NE1, and Baek Ji-young each won two awards.

Background
The event marked the thirteenth of the annual music awards. With its slogan "Music Makes One", MAMA was broadcast live in China, Japan, Hong Kong and Southeast Asia through various channels, as well as in the US and Canada. It was co-hosted by Singapore broadcaster MediaCorp.

Artists Kim Hyun Joong, Beast, Miss A, Hyuna, Leessang, Koda Kumi, Vision Wei, Aziatix, Jane Zhang, and Seo In Young all won awards during the televised broadcast. On the other hand, Big Bang, CN Blue, and IU also won awards, but were not able to attend the ceremony. In total, there were twenty-five awards, including awards not given out during the broadcast of the awards ceremony. International artists are also seen with their greetings on screen including Namcha, Sodagreen, Nicholas Teo, Leo Ku, Natthew, Kwon Sang-woo, Jackie Chan, Quincy Jones, Joey Yung, Golf, Penny Tai, Eason Chan, Lollipop F, and Derrick Hoh.

Performers

Presenters

 Lee Byung-hun – welcome Address
 Miss A – presented Best New Male Artists
 Park Si-yeon – presented Best New Female Artists
 Dick Lee and Kit Chan – introduced performers Lang Lang and Beast, Singapore's Choice Award
 Song Seung-heon – introduced performer Koda Kumi and presented her with the Hottest Asian Artist Award
 Gong Hyung-jin and Fann Wong – presented Best New Asian Solo Artist and Best New Asian Group Artist
 Yura – Host/Entertainer 
 Kim Sung-soo and Yoon Seung-ah – presented Best OST and Best Rap Performance
 Dynamic Duo, Yong Jun-hyung, and Yoon Doo-joon – introduced performers will.i.am and apl.de.ap of Black Eyed Peas
 Lee Byung-hun – introduced performers Ulala Session of Superstar K3
 Kim Soo-hyun and Nam Gyu-ri – presented Best Male Solo Artist and Best Female Solo Artist
 Song Joong-ki – introduced performer Jane Zhang and presented her with the Best Asian Artist Award
 Oh Ji-ho – presented Style in Music Award
 PK and Chrissa of Mnet America – Host/Entertainer
 Lang Lang and Park Si-yeon – presented Best Dance Performance - Male Group, introduced the Superstar K Finalists as performers and presented Best Dance Performance - Female Group
 Park Si-hoo and Kim Min-hee – presented Best Vocal Group Performance
 DJ Koo and Kang So-ra – presented Best Dance Performance - Solo
 Baek Ji-yeon – presented Mnet Specialized Award
 Bae Soo-bin and Han Chae-young – presented Best Male Group and Best Female Group
 Lee Byung-hun – introduced performers Snoop Dogg and Dr. Dre
 Ji Sung and Han Hyo-joo – presented Song of the Year
 Go Soo and Yoon Eun-hye – presented Artist of the Year
 Kim Hee-sun – presented Album of the Year

Winners and nominees

Winners are listed first and highlighted in boldface.

Special awards
 Singapore's Choice Award: Super Junior
 Hottest Asian Artist Award: Koda Kumi
 Best New Asian Solo Artist: Vision Wei
 Best New Asian Group Artist: Aziatix
 Best Asian Artist: Jane Zhang
 Style in Music Award: Seo In-young
 Mnet Specialized Award: YB (Yoon Do Hyun Band)

Multiple awards

Artist(s) with multiple wins
The following artist(s) received two or more wins (excluding the special awards):

Artist(s) with multiple nominations
The following artist(s) received more than two nominations:

Presenters and performers
The following individuals and groups, listed in order of appearance, presented awards or performed musical numbers.

References

External links
 Mnet Asian Music Awards  official website

MAMA Awards ceremonies
2011 in South Korean music
2011 in Singapore
2011 music awards